is a Japanese male curler.

At the national level, he is a two-time Japan men's champion curler (2010, 2011).

Teams

References

External links

Living people
Japanese male curlers
Japanese curling champions
Year of birth missing (living people)
Place of birth missing (living people)